Robert Marvin Thompson Jr. (September 9, 1959 – January 27, 2005) was a Canadian football player who played professionally for the Winnipeg Blue Bombers and Hamilton Tiger-Cats.

References

1959 births
2005 deaths